John Malcolm Scott  (born 1934) is an Australian sailor. He won a silver medal in the Sharpie class with Rolly Tasker at the 1956 Summer Olympics.

References 
 

1934 births
Living people
Australian male sailors (sport)
Olympic silver medalists for Australia
Sailors at the 1956 Summer Olympics – 12 m2 Sharpie
Olympic sailors of Australia
Olympic medalists in sailing

Medalists at the 1956 Summer Olympics
20th-century Australian people